Events from the year 1824 in Scotland.

Incumbents

Law officers 
 Lord Advocate – Sir William Rae, Bt
 Solicitor General for Scotland – John Hope

Judiciary 
 Lord President of the Court of Session – Lord Granton
 Lord Justice General – The Duke of Montrose
 Lord Justice Clerk – Lord Boyle

Events 
 19 April – brigantine Helen of Dundee, bound for Quebec, founders on what becomes known as Helen's Reef off Rockall with fatalities.
 17 May – the Monkland and Kirkintilloch Railway is authorised; construction begins the following month.
 24 May – the foundation stone for an oil-gas works at Tanfield in Edinburgh is laid by Sir Walter Scott, the company chairman.
 October – Edinburgh Academy, built to the design of William Burn, opens.
 10 October – Edinburgh Town Council makes a decision to found a municipal fire brigade under James Braidwood, the first in Britain.
 15–21 November – Great Fire of Edinburgh, starting in Old Assembly Close, kills 11 residents and 2 firemen, and destroys 24 tenements – leaving 400 families homeless – and other properties, including the spire of Tron Kirk.
 Blairquhan Castle near Maybole, rebuilt to the design of William Burn for Sir David Hunter-Blair, 3rd Baronet, is completed.
 Speyside Scotch whisky distilleries established: Balmenach, Glenlivet and Macallan. Also, Cameron Bridge distillery is established by Haig.
 The Foot-Ball Club is established in Edinburgh, one of the earliest known clubs organised to play any kind of football.
 The Northern Yacht Club, a predecessor of the Royal Northern and Clyde Yacht Club, is established in Rothesay.
 The Perth Golfing Society is formed.

Births 
 24 February – John Dick Peddie, architect (died 1891)
 8 March – John Elder, marine engineer (died 1869 in London)
 21 March – James Samuel, railway engineer (died 1874 in London)
 4 July – Robert B. Lindsay, Governor of Alabama (died 1902 in the United States)
 21 October – John Ritchie Findlay, newspaper owner and philanthropist (died 1898)
 10 December – George MacDonald, writer, poet and Christian minister (died 1905 in England)
 17 December – John Kerr, physicist (died 1907)
 George Campbell, administrator in British India and Liberal politician (died 1892 in Cairo)

Deaths 
 12 January – Walter Oudney, physician and explorer (born 1790; died in Africa)
 15 January – Francis Dundas, British Army general and governor of Cape Colony (born c.1759)
 17 January – James Brodie of Brodie, botanist, clan chief and politician (born 1744)
 31 March – Andrew Fyfe, anatomist (born 1754)
 15 May – Alexander Campbell, musician and writer (born 1764)
 19 December – Charles Smith, painter (born 1749)
 Approximate date – John Gunn, musician (born c.1765)

The arts
 Thomas Campbell's Miscellaneous Poems is published.
 James Hogg's novel The Private Memoirs and Confessions of a Justified Sinner is published anonymously.
 William Knox's poetry collection Songs of Israel is published.
 Sir Walter Scott's novel Redgauntlet is published anonymously.
 Edwin Landseer visits Scotland for the first time to paint a portrait of Sir Walter Scott; he will return annually, concentrating on animal portraits.

See also 

 1824 in the United Kingdom

References 

 
Scotland
1820s in Scotland